Canticle Of Canticles is a weekly one-hour musical program hosted by an Armenian presenters Khoren Levonyan & Hrant Tokhatyan, and airing on Yerevan-based Public Television company of Armenia. The project mainly focuses on the Armenian folk music– from medieval canticles to bard songs of the late 1980s.

Awards and nominations

References

Public Television Company of Armenia original programming
2010s Armenian television series
2020s Armenian television series
Armenian-language television shows